Sorabhag is a village development committee in Morang District in the Kosi Zone of south-eastern Nepal. At the time of the 1991 Nepal census it had a population of 7865 people living in 1605 individual households. Popular market called KARSIYA lies here. Rangeli raid passes through it.

References
Sorabhag is developing village development committee which is surrounded by Cheka Khola from eastern side whereas Gadiya Khola from western side.

Karsiya Lies by the side of Gadiya Khola.Karsiya is nearly famous place in Sorabhag V.D.C .Karsiya is only big market which helps you to shop your goods.

There's a government school named as Sharada Higher Secondary School Lies at karsiya Bazar.

Village development committees in Morang District
Dhanpalthan Rural Municipality